Evita “Evie” Turquoise Robinson (born 1984), an African-American woman known for her role as a pioneer of the urban travel movement, was born and raised in New York. She is the founder of Nomadness Travel Tribe and Nomadness TV.

After graduating from Iona College, where she studied film and television, Robinson attended the New York Film Academy in Paris for a digital filmmaking program. Robinson was born in Albany, raised in Poughkeepsie, New York, and has also lived in Paris, Japan, and Thailand.

Nomadness Travel 
Prior to creating the diversity- and community-oriented Nomadness Travel Tribe in September 2011, Robinson featured her solo travel experiences on Nomadness TV. The DIY travel webseries has grown from 100 of Robinson's Facebook group to include more than 19,000 travelers worldwide through Nomadness Travel Tribe.

The Nomadness virtual community, which caters primarily to African-Americans due to a lack of representation in the target market for tourism and hospitality companies, is an invitation-only group of travelers dedicated to building an inclusive travel community and making world travel more accessible to people of color. Influenced by Seth Godin’s book, Tribes: We Need You to Lead Us, Robinson chose to refer to her travel group as a “tribe” to convey the innate quality for humans to seek out community.

In 2015, The New York Times reported that the collective consisted of approximately 10,000 travelers spanning 36 countries. At that time, about half of the group’s members were millennials, and the majority were African-American women. In early 2017, the group’s membership was reported to be 80 percent female.

Since its inception, Nomadness Travel Tribe has organized at least four trips annually. The group’s last international trip, to Panama, took place in December 2016. Robinson announced that Nomadness would instead focus on “international popup events,” including a February 2017 event in Johannesburg, a Holi celebration in India in March, and an adult prom at the Museum of Aviation in Georgia in June. 2018 showed a resurgence in Nomadness group trips, with a new emotion-based itinerary model that Robinson created. 

In 2017, Robinson was appointed as a member of the TED Residency's third cohort. At the conclusion of the program she gave the first ever TED Talk on the Black Travel Movement.

References

External links 
 Evita Robinson's website
 Nomadness Travel Tribe website

1984 births
Living people
African-American people
Iona University alumni
American expatriates in France
American expatriates in Japan
American expatriates in Thailand